The 1936 All-Eastern football team consists of American football players chosen by various selectors as the best players at each position among the Eastern colleges and universities during the 1936 college football season.

All-Eastern selections

Quarterbacks
 Clint Frank, Yale (AP-1, PW [hb])
 Ken Sandbach, Princeton (AK)
 Lew Elverson, Penn (PW)

Halfbacks
 Franny Murray, Penn (AP-1, AK))
 William T. Ingram II, Navy (AP-1)
 Bill Osmanski, Holy Cross (AK, PW [fb])
 Marshall Goldberg, Pittsburgh (PW)

Fullbacks
 John Handrahan, Dartmouth (AP-1, AK)

Ends
 Larry Kelley, Yale (AP-1, AK, PW)
 Bill Daddio, Pittsburgh (AP-1, AK, PW)

Tackles
 Ave Daniell, Pittsburgh (AP-1)
 Charles Toll Jr., Princeton
 Ed Franco, Fordham (AK)
 Bill Docherty, Temple (AK, PW)
 Red Chesbro, Colgate (PW)

Guards
 Nathaniel Pierce, Fordham (AP-1, AK)
 Bill Glassford, Pittsburgh (AP-1, AK)
 France, Fordham (PW)
 Bill Montgomery, Princeton (PW)

Centers
 Mike Basrak, Duquesne (AP-1, PW)
 Alex Wojciechowicz, Fordham (AK)

Key
 AP = Associated Press
 AK = Andrew Kerr
 PW = Pop Warner

See also
 1936 College Football All-America Team

References

All-Eastern
All-Eastern college football teams